Sphinx chisoya, the chisoya sphinx, is a moth of the family Sphingidae. It is known from tropical and subtropical lowlands from southern Texas to Mexico.

The wingspan is 70–82 mm. The forewing upperside is dark gray to bluish gray with narrow black streaks. The posterior margin of the discal cell is marked by a dark line. There is a dark, wavy submarginal line which is made more prominent by a light gray band distal to it. The hindwing upperside is dark gray, with two diffuse, light gray bands.

References

Sphinx (genus)
Moths described in 1932